Pipalkot is a village development committee in Dailekh District in the Bheri Zone of mid western region Nepal. At the time of the 1991 Nepal census it had a population of 1876 people living in 318 individual households.

References

Villages of Pipalkot
There are many villages at Pipalkot VDC. Some villages' names are as following:
Tolichakha
Chiuri
Patemela
Gorkhi
Laypatal
Kitu
Jamnepani
Sugarkhal 
Killahanna

External links
UN map of the municipalities of Dailekh District

Populated places in Dailekh District